Shelley Ann Beattie (August 24, 1967 – February 16, 2008) was a professional female bodybuilder and actress. Beattie's highest placement was the top three at the Ms. International and Ms. Olympia contests, the two most prestigious shows for female professional bodybuilders. She was one of the few deaf professional female bodybuilders in the world, making the cover of Deaf Life magazine twice in the 1990s. After her retirement, she joined the Grinder on America's Cup team, finishing second place in both 1994 and 1995. In 2008, she died by suicide.

Early life 

Shelley Beattie was born in Orange County, California.

Beattie became deaf at the age of three due to an aspirin overdose. In school, she learned sign language and had several operations and speech therapy to improve her ability to communicate. However, Beattie was socially isolated due to her deafness and turned to sports as an outlet. She competed track and field, including heptathlon, cross country, hurdling, and 400 meter sprints. She also set a school record for the low hurdle. At the age of 14, she began lifting weights to improve her times. At age 16, Beattie sustained an ankle injury that she believed was career-ending.

Beattie's home life was unstable. Between the ages of 14 and 17, she had been placed in three different foster homes and had attended three different schools. She turned to weightlifting as an outlet to cope with anxiety and frustration.

Beattie attended Western Oregon State College in Monmouth from 1984 to 1988, graduating with a degree in child psychology and special education. During this time, she also studied jazz dance and choreography, and joined a dance company.

Bodybuilding career 

She also began entering and competing in amateur bodybuilding competitions at this time. In her first competition, the Portland Rose Cup Novice, she weighed in at 124 pounds and finished fourth in the heavyweight class. Soon, she began reaching the top five of every amateur competition she entered, including several wins. She developed a friendly rivalry with fellow bodybuilder Nikki Fuller, often times finishing second to her in competitions.

In 1989, Beattie met Aaron Shelley, an exercise and physiology graduate at Oregon State. With Shelley, she improved her diet and training, resulting in her taking the overall title at the 1990 NPC Emerald Cup and the Pacific Coast Championships. After winning the overall title at the 1990 NPC USA Championship, she turned pro. Due to internal politics at the International Federation of BodyBuilders, she was unable to enter the 1990 Ms. Olympia after her USA Championship win.

She went on to enter the 1991 Ms. International, finishing third. At the 1991 Ms. Olympia, she placed seventh. In the 1992 Ms. Olympia, her placement of third was her highest professional bodybuilding achievement. Beattie retired after placing seventh in the 1993 Ms. Olympia contest. In addition to being a professional bodybuilder, Beattie worked as a group home counselor for developmentally delayed teenagers.

Retirement 

After retiring, Beattie competed as a grinder on the America³ sailing team (the first all-women's America's Cup team). She also jointed the cast of the American Gladiators TV series under the name "Siren", competing in 44 episodes between 1992 and 1997. Because she was deaf, she took visual cues from referee Larry Thompson and fellow gladiator Salina Bartunek (known as "Elektra" on the show). Spectators would also wave their hands in the air or stomp their feet instead of applauding.

Personal life and death 

Beattie was bisexual. She had a six-year relationship with John Romano, a magazine columnist at Muscular Development. At the time of her death, Beattie lived on a farm east of Salem, Oregon, with girlfriend Julie Moisa.

Beattie was diagnosed with bipolar disorder. On February 13, 2008, she attempted suicide by hanging and died three days later, aged 40.

Filmography

American Gladiators (TV Series) – Siren (1992–1996)
Hot Shots! Part Deux (1993) – Siren

Contest history

 1986 – Portland Rose Cup Novice 4th (HW)
 1987 – Collegiate Emerald Empire 1st (HW)
 1987 – Portland Rose Cup Novice 3rd (HW)
 1988 – Portland Rose Cup Novice 3rd (HW)
 1988 – Oregon Championships 3rd (HW)
 1989 – Western Oregon Championships 1st (HW)
 1989 – Collegiate Emerald Empire 1st (HW)
 1989 – Vancouver Natural Championships 1st (HW)
 1989 – Portland Rose Cup Novice 1st (HW)
 1989 – NPC Emerald Cup 2nd (HW)
 1989 – Pacific Coast Championships 2nd (HW)
 1990 – NPC Emerald Cup – 1st (HW & Overall)
 1990 – NPC USA Championship – 1st (HW & Overall)
 1991 – IFBB Ms. International – 3rd
 1991 – IFBB Ms. Olympia – 7th
 1992 – IFBB Ms. International – 7th
 1992 – IFBB Ms. Olympia – 3rd
 1993 – IFBB Ms. International – 9th
 1993 – IFBB Ms. Olympia – 7th

Other competitions 

1994 Grinder on America3 America's Cup team – 2nd
1995 Grinder on America3 America's Cup team – 2nd

Magazine covers

 December 1990 – MuscleMag International
 July 1991 – DeafLife Volume IV, Number 1
 January 1991 – NPC News
 December 1992 – DeafLife Volume V, Number 6
 March 1993 – Female Bodybuilding
 August 1993 – Muscular Development
 December 1993 – Iron Man
 February 1994 – Muscular Development
 September 1994 – Muscular Development
 November 1994 – Women's Physique World
 January 1998 – Muscular Development

References

Bradford, Reg.  The Butterfly has Spread it's Wings!. Nebraska: Muscle Mag International (no. 134). August 1993. USPS 4601. (Lincoln, NE: Canusa Products/Foote & Davies, 1992.). Biography Section: pages 126–128, 130, 132–136, 139–140, 143, and 147–148 cover Shelley Beattie story.

Further reading

External links
Beattie's Stats
American Gladiators Siren Profile (GladiatorsTV.com)
America³ profile

Tribute by John Romano and Muscular Development readers.
Article on Beatty's life from Statesman Journal
Article on Beattie's life from The Oregonian

1967 births
2008 deaths
American female bodybuilders
Bisexual women
Deaf sportspeople
American LGBT sportspeople
People with bipolar disorder
Professional bodybuilders
Suicides by hanging in Oregon
Western Oregon University alumni
American deaf people
LGBT bodybuilders
2008 suicides
20th-century American women
20th-century LGBT people
21st-century American women